Outfest is an LGBTQ-oriented nonprofit that produces two film festivals, operates a movie streaming platform, and runs educational services for filmmakers  in Los Angeles. Outfest is one of the key partners, alongside the Frameline Film Festival, the New York Lesbian, Gay, Bisexual, & Transgender Film Festival, and the Inside Out Film and Video Festival, in launching the North American Queer Festival Alliance, an initiative to further publicize and promote LGBT film.

History
In 1979, John Ramirez and Stuart Timmons, two students at the University of California, Los Angeles (UCLA), founded a gay film festival on campus. By 1982, it had become known as the "Gay and Lesbian Media Festival and Conference." The name was changed to Outfest in 1994.

In September 2016, Outfest held its first traveling film festival in Northampton, Massachusetts, at the Academy of Music Theatre.

In June 2020, Outfest partnered with Film Independent to launch the United in Pride digital film festival. Outfest was also one of the key partners, alongside the Frameline Film Festival, the New York Lesbian, Gay, Bisexual, & Transgender Film Festival and the Inside Out Film and Video Festival, in launching the North American Queer Festival Alliance, an initiative to further publicize and promote LGBT film.

Programs
 Outfest Los Angeles LGBTQ Film Festival – Eleven days of world-class films, discussions and parties.
 Outfest Fusion LGBTQ BIPOC Film Festival – Spotlighting the diversity of the LGBTQ community.
 Outfest UCLA Legacy Project – The only program in the world dedicated to protecting LGBTQ films for future generations.
 Outfest Forward – Developing the next generation of artists and filmmakers through education and mentoring.

Initiatives
Youth

Outfest supports youth through education, mentoring and access to meaningful LGBTQ stories. It also includes:
 Free memberships to youth age 21 years and younger
 OutSet: The Young Filmmakers Project a Collaboration between Outfest and LifeWorks
 Emerging Leaders Council
Alumni

Outfest promotes works by its alumni and encourages them to help educate new and upcoming filmmakers.

Awards
Outfest Los Angeles gives annual awards in 16 categories. Awards are given by Grand Juries, festival audiences and the Programming Committees. Jury awards are given for: 
 US Narrative Feature
 International Feature
 Screenwriting
 Performance in a Feature Film
 Documentary Feature

Audience Awards are given for:
 First Narrative Feature
 Narrative Feature
 Documentary Feature
 Narrative Short Film
 Documentary Short Film 

Programming awards are given for:
 Freedom Award
 Outstanding Emerging Talent
 Outstanding Artistic Achievement

Outfest also presents the Outfest Achievement Award, the Outfest Honors, the Outfest Screenwriting Lab Award and the Screen Idol Award.

See also
 List of LGBT film festivals

References

External links

 Outfest UCLA Legacy Project at UCLA Film & Television Archive

Film festivals in Los Angeles
LGBT film festivals in the United States
LGBT culture in Los Angeles
LGBT events in California
Annual events in California
Film festivals established in 1982
1982 establishments in California
1982 in Los Angeles
Cinema of Southern California